Roberto Rodríguez Araya (born 28 July 1990) is a Swiss professional footballer who plays as a midfielder for FC Zürich U21. He holds both Swiss and Spanish citizenships.

He is the older brother of fellow professional footballers Ricardo and Francisco.

References

External links
 

1990 births
Living people
Footballers from Zürich
Swiss men's footballers
Swiss people of Basque descent
Swiss people of Spanish descent
Swiss people of Chilean descent
Association football midfielders
FC St. Gallen players
FC Wil players
AC Bellinzona players
Novara F.C. players
SpVgg Greuther Fürth players
FC Zürich players
KFC Uerdingen 05 players
FC Schaffhausen players
Swiss Super League players
Swiss Challenge League players
3. Liga players
Expatriate footballers in Italy
Expatriate footballers in Germany
Swiss expatriate footballers
Swiss expatriate sportspeople in Italy
Swiss expatriate sportspeople in Germany
Swiss people of Galician descent
Sportspeople of Spanish descent
Sportspeople of Chilean descent